Cory Bay is an arm of the Foxe Basin in the Qikiqtaaluk Region of Nunavut, Canada. It is located on northeastern Foxe Peninsula, in western Baffin Island.

The Great Plain of the Koukdjuak stretches from Cory Bay to Hantzsch Bay, and then inland.

References

Bays of Foxe Basin